Postma is a surname of Frisian origin. In 2007 there were 12,395 people in the Netherlands with the surname, most concentrated in the province of Friesland. The form Postema (2,069 people) is more common in the neighboring province of Groningen.  The surname's origin may be in "posthumous" (a child born after the death of his father), occupational (mailman, guard) or toponymic (from an outpost, etc.).  People with the name include:

Angela Postma (born 1971), Dutch freestyle swimmer
Anni Friesinger-Postma (born 1977), German world-champion speed skater, married to Ids Postma
Antoon Postma (1929–2016), Dutch anthropologist living among the Hanunó'o tribe in the Philippines
Dirkje Postma (born 1951), Dutch pathophysiologist
Erik Postma (1953-2002), Dutch mayor
Gerriet Postma (1932–2009), Dutch painter
Herman Postma (1933-2004), American scientist and educator
Ids Postma (born 1973), Dutch world-champion speed skater, married to Anni Friesinger
 (1895-1944), Dutch Communist politician
Jan Diederik Postma (1890-1962), Dutch architect
 (born 1983), Dutch ice hockey player
Mariska Kramer-Postma (born 1974), Dutch triathlete
Martine Postma (born 1970), Dutch founder of Repair Café
 (1868-1963), Dutch West-Frisian poet
Paul Postma (born 1989), Canadian ice hockey player
Pieter-Jan Postma (born 1982), Dutch Olympic sailor
Stefan Postma (born 1976), Dutch footballer
Tineke Postma (born 1978), Dutch saxophonist
Willy Postma (born 1932), Dutch track-and-field athlete
Postema
 (1919–2013), Dutch author
 (born 1932), Dutch television reporter and presenter
Pam Postema (born 1954), American baseball umpire

References

External links
 postma.family community website dedicated to the genealogy of one family tree originating in Friesland

Surnames of Frisian origin